Rodney Luther Myers (born June 26, 1969) is an American former professional baseball pitcher. He played in Major League Baseball (MLB) for the Chicago Cubs, San Diego Padres, and Los Angeles Dodgers, and in Nippon Professional Baseball (NPB) for the Hanshin Tigers.

Myers was drafted by the Kansas City Royals in the 12th round of the 1990 Major League Baseball Draft out of the University of Wisconsin–Madison. In the Royals system, he played for the Eugene Emeralds (A-, 1990), Appleton Foxes (A, 1991), Lethbridge Mounties (Rookie, 1992), Memphis Chicks (AA, 1993–1994), and Omaha Royals (AAA, 1995).

Myers was selected by the Chicago Cubs in the Rule 5 Draft in 1996 and spent the entire season in the Cubs major league bullpen. He alternated between the Cubs and their triple A team (Iowa Cubs) from 1997–1999 and then was traded to the San Diego Padres for Gary Matthews Jr.

Myers pitched for the Padres from 2000–2002 and then for the Los Angeles Dodgers for two seasons. After being released in midseason in 2004, he signed with the Hanshin Tigers in Japan, where he finished the season. After playing independent league ball in 2005, Myers retired from baseball.

External links
 or Baseball-Almanac

Los Angeles Dodgers players
Chicago Cubs players
San Diego Padres players
Major League Baseball pitchers
Baseball players from Illinois
Sportspeople from Rockford, Illinois
American expatriate baseball players in Japan
Hanshin Tigers players
Wisconsin Badgers baseball players
Eugene Emeralds players
Appleton Foxes players
Lethbridge Mounties players
Memphis Chicks players
Rockford Royals players
Wilmington Blue Rocks players
Omaha Royals players
Iowa Cubs players
Rancho Cucamonga Quakes players
Portland Beavers players
Las Vegas 51s players
Kingsport Mets players
Long Island Ducks players
Lincoln Saltdogs players
1969 births
Living people